Steve Sheinkin is an American author of suspenseful history books for young adults. A former textbook writer, Sheinkin began writing full-time nonfiction books for young readers in 2008. His work has been praised for making historical information more accessible.

Rabbi Harvey
Sheinkin has written and illustrated three fictional graphic novels about Rabbi Harvey, a fictional Jewish rabbi who also functions as an Old West sheriff, using Jewish rabbinical wisdom to solve problems usually solved with firearms in the fictional Rocky Mountain town of Elk Spring, Colorado. The books, which were published through Jewish Lights Publishing, consist of The Adventures of Rabbi Harvey, Rabbi Harvey Rides Again, and Rabbi Harvey vs. the Wisdom Kid. The eclectic stories, which combine Jewish legends and frontier legends, sprung from Sheinkin's own eclectic childhood as a Jewish-American boy raised on both Jewish folktales and American Westerns. The character of Rabbi Harvey also contains elements of the author's own father, David Sheinkin.

Awards & honors
Sheinkin's nonfiction books, Bomb: The Race to Build—and Steal—the World's Most Dangerous Weapon and The Port Chicago 50: Disaster, Mutiny, and the Fight for Civil Rights, were both National Book Award finalists. In 2013, Bomb also won the Newbery Honor and Sibert Medal from the American Library Association. The Port Chicago 50 won the Carter G. Woodson Book Award in 2015. His 2015 book, Most Dangerous: Daniel Ellsberg and the Secret History of the Vietnam War, was also a finalist for the National Book Award, and was called “easily the best study of the Vietnam War available for teen readers.

Select bibliography

Fallout: Spies, Superbombs, and the Ultimate Cold War Showdown, Roaring Brook Press, 2021
Born to Fly: The First Women's Air Race Across America, Roaring Brook Press, 2019
Time Twisters series
Neil Armstrong and Nat Love, Space Cowboys, Roaring Brook Press, 2019
Amelia Earhart and the Flying Chariot, Roaring Brook Press, 2019
Abigail Adams, Pirate of the Caribbean, Roaring Brook Press, 2018 
Abraham Lincoln, Pro Wrestler, Roaring Brook Press, 2018
Undefeated: Jim Thorpe and the Carlisle Indian School Football Team, Roaring Brook Press, 2017
Most Dangerous: Daniel Ellsberg and the Secret History of the Vietnam War, Roaring Brook Press, 2015
The Port Chicago 50: Disaster, Mutiny, and the Fight for Civil Rights, Roaring Brook Press, 2014
The Notorious Benedict Arnold: A True Story of Adventure, Heroism & Treachery, Square Fish, 2013
Lincoln's Grave Robbers, Scholastic Press, 2013
Bomb: The Race to Build—and Steal—the World's Most Dangerous Weapon, Roaring Brook Press, 2012
Which Way to the Wild West? Everything Your Schoolbooks Didn't Tell You About Westward Expansion, Flash Point, 2009
Two Miserable Presidents, Everything Your Schoolbooks Didn't Tell You About the Civil War, Square Fish, 2008
Rabbi Harvey graphic novel series
Rabbi Harvey vs. the Wisdom Kid: A Graphic Novel of Dueling Jewish Folktales in the Wild West, Jewish Lights Publishing, 2010
Rabbi Harvey Rides Again: A Graphic Novel of Jewish Folktales Let Loose in the Wild West, Jewish Lights Publishing, 2008
The Adventures of Rabbi Harvey: A Graphic Novel of Jewish Wisdom and Wit in the Wild West, Jewish Lights Publishing, 2006
King George: What Was His Problem?: Everything Your Schoolbooks Didn't Tell You About the American Revolution, Flash Point, 2005

References

American writers of young adult literature
Carter G. Woodson Book Award winners
Living people
Year of birth missing (living people)
Jewish American novelists
American graphic novelists
American historical fiction writers
21st-century American Jews